Plasticity  may refer to:

Science
 Plasticity (physics), in engineering and physics, the propensity of a solid material to undergo permanent deformation under load
 Neuroplasticity, in neuroscience, how entire brain structures, and the brain itself, can change as a result of experience
 Synaptic plasticity, the property of a neuron or synapse to change its internal parameters in response to its history
 Metaplasticity, the plasticity of synapses
 Phenotypic plasticity, in biology, describes the ability of an organism to change its phenotype in response to changes in the environment

Art and entertainment
 Plastic arts, such as clay sculpture, in which material is formed or deformed into a new, permanent shape
 Plasticity, an album by Cabaret Voltaire
 "Plasticities", a song by Andrew Bird, from the album Armchair Apocrypha

Events
 Plasticity Forum is a conference on the future of plastic and how to reduce impacts on the environment.

See also
 Plastic (disambiguation)
 Neo-Plasticism